Drake Nunatak is a nunatak  high at the base of Bermel Escarpment and 1 nautical mile (2 km) east of Elliott Nunatak, in the Thiel Mountains. The name was proposed by Arthur Ford and Peter Bermel, co-leaders of the United States Geological Survey (USGS) Thiel Mountains party of 1960–61, for Avery A. Drake, Jr., a USGS geologist aboard the USS Glacier to the Thurston Island and Bellingshausen Sea area, 1960–61.

References 

Nunataks of Ellsworth Land